Archie Rose Distilling Co. is an  Australian distillery, producing a diverse range of whiskies, gins, vodkas, rums, as well as one-off collaborations, limited releases and spirits experiences. It was founded in 2014.  It is one of the City of Sydney's first independent distilleries of craft spirits since 1853.

History 
Archie Rose Distilling Co. was founded in Sydney by Will Edwards in 2014. Edwards began research in 2012, with visits to New York distilleries, and through meetings with other Australian distillers.

Upon returning to Sydney, Edwards commissioned Peter Bailly, Australia's only still maker at the time, to hand-build three copper pot stills which are steam heated by a gas-powered steam boiler.

Archie Rose launched in March 2015 as both a Distillery and Bar located in Rosebery, Sydney. The company initially produced three spirits, Signature Dry Gin, Original Vodka and White Rye—though casks of Rye and Single Malt Whisky were laid down early, with the Archie Rose whiskies launching in 2019 and 2020 respectively.

Archie Rose has produced spirits such as gins, whiskies, vodkas, rums, and others.

In 2020, Archie Rose moved its distillery operations to Banksmeadow, Sydney.  The original Rosebery distillery, located next to the Archie Rose Bar, was converted into an event space.

References

External links 

 Official website

Australian distilled drinks
Australian vodkas
Australian whisky
Distilleries in Australia
Australian companies established in 2014
Food and drink companies based in Sydney
Food and drink companies established in 2014
Gins
Manufacturing companies based in Sydney